José Manuel Lafuente Garrido (born 13 May 1984 in Baiona, Pontevedra), known as Senel, is a Spanish retired footballer who played as a forward.

Honours
Spain U16
UEFA European Under-16 Championship: 2001

External links

1984 births
Living people
People from Vigo (comarca)
Sportspeople from the Province of Pontevedra
Spanish footballers
Footballers from Galicia (Spain)
Association football forwards
La Liga players
Segunda División B players
Tercera División players
Deportivo de La Coruña players
Atlético Malagueño players
Atlético Madrid C players
Atlético Madrid B players
Zamora CF footballers
CD Mirandés footballers
Spain youth international footballers